Artak Aleksanyan (born on 10 March 1991) is an Armenian football player who is currently a Free Agent, he last played for FC Ararat Yerevan and the Armenia national football team. He also holds Russian citizenship.

Club career
Artak's family moved to Moscow when he was two years old.

In January 2009, he signed a contract with and transferred to the reigning Armenian Premier League champions Pyunik Yerevan. On the field, Aleksanyan played periodically. As part of Pyunik, he debuted in the 2009–10 UEFA Champions League on 14 July 2009 in a home match against Dinamo Zagreb. Aleksanyan came off the bench in the 68th minute.

In December, his contract with Pyunik ended. After negotiations with several clubs, in January he signed a contract with the Ural Sverdlovsk Oblast, playing in the Russian National Football League. The contract was set for one year.

Due to not playing in the first team of the Ural, Aleksanyan has decided to change clubs. In January 2011, arrived at the camp in Mordovia Saransk and started their training. However, after some time Aleksanyan arrived in Yerevan and with Pyunik on a training camp in Cyprus. After a contract was signed for a year, which was close to the end of August, both parties later terminated it with mutual desire.

On 31 August, FC Khimki presented Aleksanyan on their squad. A contract was signed and lasted until the end of 2012. In late June, Aleksanyan, along with Arthur Yedigaryan and Edward Tatoyan, left the club. However, in late July, he returned to the club by signing a new contract.

International career
On 9 February 2011, Aleksanyan debuted for the Armenia national football team in a friendly match against Georgia. He was substituted in at the 85th minute in place of Edgar Manucharyan.

Personal life
Artak has a father, Levon, a mother, Nune, and a younger brother Arthur.

His agent is Valeri Aleksanyan Oganesyan.

Honours

Club
Pyunik Yerevan
Armenian Premier League (1): 2009
Armenian Premier League Runner-up (1): 2011
Armenian Cup (1): 2009
Armenian Supercup Runner-up (1): 2009

References

External links

Profile at ffa.am

spartak.com

1991 births
Living people
Footballers from Yerevan
Armenian footballers
Armenia youth international footballers
Armenia under-21 international footballers
Armenia international footballers
Armenian expatriate footballers
FC Pyunik players
FC Ural Yekaterinburg players
Expatriate footballers in Russia
FC Khimki players
Armenian Premier League players
FC Baltika Kaliningrad players
FC Armavir players
FC Spartak Moscow players
Association football defenders
FC Ararat Moscow players
FC Ararat Yerevan players